Kenneth William Scarlett OAM (born 1927) is an Australian writer specialising in Australian sculpture. His 1980 publication Australian Sculptors (1980) was the first to present a complete survey of sculpture in Australia. Subsequent publications include Sculpture in Public Gardens (1983), Limited Recall: A Fictional Autobiography (2005), Elgee Park: Sculpture in the Landscape (2010) and monographs on the sculptors John Davis (1989) and Andrew Rogers (2010). He is a contributing editor to Sculpture (magazine), USA and his articles appear regularly in art journals in Australia and overseas.

For many years he lectured in sculpture at tertiary institutions before becoming the director of Gryphon Gallery in Melbourne. More recently he has not only curated a number of exhibitions of sculpture in major galleries, including McClelland Gallery and Sculpture Park and Heide Museum of Modern Art, but also unorthodox venues such as hospitals, shopping complexes, parks and gardens. The Sculpture Walk in Melbourne's Royal Botanic Gardens (1996), was a major exhibition.

He is regularly invited to lecture on various aspects of Australian sculpture, which he has done at the National Gallery of Victoria, the Art Gallery of New South Wales and Sotheby's and Christie's auction houses. In 1996 he was awarded the Medal of the Order of Australia for services to sculpture.

Books
 Australian Sculptors. (1980) Thomas Nelson. 
 The Sculpture of John Davis: Places and Locations. (1989) Hyland House Publishing. 
 Contemporary Sculpture in Australian Gardens, (1993) Craftsman House/ Gordon and BreachArts International. 
 Rhythms of Life: Andrew Rogers. (2003) Palgrave Macmillan. 
 Limited Recall. (2005) Macmillan Art Publishing, Melbourne. 
 Elgee Park: Sculpture in the Landscape. (2010) Macmillan Art Publishing, Melbourne.

Curation
Since 1988 Ken Scarlett has acted as Curator of the following exhibitions -

1988  John Davis: Places and Locations., at Heide Park and Art Gallery.
1990  Contemporary Australian Sculpture, for ACAF Australian Contemporary Art Fair Two at Royal Exhibition Building, Melbourne.
1992  Contemporary Australian Sculpture Exhibition, ACAF Third Australian Contemporary Art Fair, Royal Exhibition Building.
1992-94 Dame Edna Regrets She is Unable to Attend - Humour and Satire in Contemporary Sculpture which toured 11 galleries in Queensland, NSW, Victoria, ACT and Tasmania.
1993- Kyneton Collection, for Shire of Kyneton.
1994  Sculpture for Heidelberg, at Heidelberg Repatriation Hospital.
1995  Continuum and Contrast, Mc Clelland Gallery.
1995  Sculpture at Heidelberg, Austin and Repatriation Medical Centre.
1995  The Kyneton Collection, Shire of Macedon Ranges.
1996  Royal Botanic Gardens, Melbourne: Sculpture Walk.
1996  Sculpture Trail, Victoria University of Technology and Footscray Park, City of Maribyrnong.
1996  Sculpture Three, Austin and Repatriation Medical Centre.
1997  House and Garden. Sculpture at Heidelberg, Austin and Repatriation Medical Centre.
1998  Sculpture in the Dandenong Ranges Gardens, Concurrence or Contrast’ Parks Victoria.
2001  Sculpture at Seawinds. Old Landscape: New Garden, Parks Victoria.
2002  Toorak Village Festival of Sculpture, Toorak.
2003  Vincas Jomantas Retrospective, Mc Clelland Gallery.
2006  Erwin Fabian: a Survey, at McCleland Gallery + Sculpture Park and Erwin Fabian: Recent Works, at Australian Galleries.
2008  Venerate the Earth sculpture of Peter Blizzard, Australian Galleries, Melbourne.
2009  Teisutis Zikaras: Sculptures and Drawings, McClelland Gallery+Sculpture Park.
2012  Sculpture and Drawings of Clive Stephen.

References

Australian writers
Australian sculpture
Living people
1927 births
Australian art historians
Writers from Melbourne
People from Brighton, Victoria
Recipients of the Medal of the Order of Australia